Tomasz Wójcik (born 6 June 1963 in Warsaw) is a Polish graphic designer, stage designer, theater director and doctor of physical sciences. Creates posters for plays, films, festivals and cultural events and promoting public awareness campaigns.

Early life 
Tomasz Wójcik was born as son of the cinematographer, professor of the National Film School in Łódź, Jerzy Wójcik and the film and theater actress Magda Teresa Wójcik. He studied physics on the Warsaw University of Technology and received his doctorate under professor Jan Petykiewicz in 1996.

Works 
His posters were exhibited at numerous exhibitions including International Poster Biennial in Wilanów, Lahti Poster Biennial, International Biennial of the Poster in Mexico City, Trnava Poster Triennial. Poster for the Polish film The complaint (Skarga) was named the best poster on Human Rights Watch International Film Festival in Strasbourg, France (1992)

Since 1986, Tomasz Wójcik designs stage sets and theatrical costumes. He is the author of 50 projects, both for performances of classical works, such as Antigone by Sophocles, Bhagavad Gita based on the Mahabharata, Richard III by William Shakespeare, as well as modern texts, such as: The Process by Franz Kafka, The Plague by Albert Camus, The Emperor by Ryszard Kapuściński.

In 1991 he made his debut as a theater director carrying out spectacle of Die Panne by Friedrich Dürrenmatt (Teatr Adekwatny, Warsaw). He also directed the original spectacle Glare (1993, Teatr Adekwatny, Warsaw) and Macbeth by William Shakespeare (2003, Teatr Na Woli, Warsaw).

Tomasz Wójcik is member of the authorities of the Teatr Adekwatny Association and was the artistic director of their projects: Festival of Contemporary Art – Four Elements, cycles of concerts and performances Lenten Triptych, cycles of screenings and meetings with the filmmakers Animagic. He was the artistic manager of the Warsaw artistic club Lokal Użytkowy.

He is the author of several graphic projects implemented in Poland and abroad, such as: visual identification of international cooperation project of art universities Inter-artes, projects of books and magazines, among others. Labyrinth of Light (Labirynt światła) by Jerzy Wójcik (2006), Hero's expedition (Wyprawa bohatera) by Seweryn Kuśmierczyk (2014).

He designed also record covers, among others: Air by Jerzy Malek (2011), Komeda-Chopin-Komeda by Lena Ledoff (2011), As sung by Billie Holiday by Ida Zalewska (2012),

Tomasz Wójcik has also designed the exhibition to celebrate the 100th anniversary of the Warsaw School of Economics in Chicago and the exhibition Reconstitution of the Memory of Poland in the European Parliament in Brussels.

He cooperated with the TV channel Kino Polska and created a brand image of digitization project of Polish cinema masterpieces Kino RP. Wójcik collaborates with the Copernicus Science Centre in Warsaw, and Warsaw University of Technology contributing to educational projects.

Selected exhibitions 
1992: Human Rights Watch International Film Festival, Strasbourg, France
1995: International Biennial of Stage Posters, Rzeszów, Poland
1996: 4th International Biennial of the Poster in Mexico City, Mexico
1997: 8th Poster Salon in Polish Poster Museum, Warsaw – Wilanów, Poland
1997: 12th Lahti Poster Biennial, Lahti, Finland
1997: 6th International Biennial of Theatre Poster, Rzeszów, Poland
1997: Contemporary Polish Poster, Chicago, USA
1997: 3rd Trnava Poster Triennial, Trnava, Slovakia
1999: 7th International Biennial of Theatre Poster, Rzeszów, Poland
2000: 4th Trnava Poster Triennial, Trnava, Slovakia
2008: 21st International Poster Biennial, Warsaw – Wilanow, Poland
2009: 17th Lahti Poster Biennial, Lahti, Finland
2012: 15th Poster Salon in Polish Poster Museum, Warsaw – Wilanów, Poland
2013: 16th Poster Salon in Polish Poster Museum, Warsaw – Wilanów, Poland
2014: Pathless Roads – Holocaust Memorial Event, Budapest

Stage Designs 
 1986:	The Trial by Franz Kafka, directed by Henryk Boukołowski, Teatr Adekwatny, Warsaw, Poland
 1986:	Advice to the Players by Bruce Bonafede, directed by Wojciech Feliksiak, Teatr Adekwatny, Warsaw, Poland
 1987:	Peer Gynt by Henrik Ibsen, directed by Henryk Czyż & Henryk Boukołowski, Teatr Adekwatny, Warsaw, Poland
 1987:	The Little Prince by Antoine de Saint - Exupéry, directed by Magda Teresa Wójcik, Teatr Bagatela, Cracov, Poland
 1987:	Anhelli Family (Ród Anchellich) by Juliusz Słowacki, directed by Wojciech Feliksiak, Teatr Adekwatny, Warsaw, Poland
 1988:	Bhagavad - Gita on the basis of Mahabharata, directed by Magda Teresa Wójcik, Teatr Adekwatny, Warsaw, Poland
 1990:	Christmas Eve1956 by Istvan Eörsi, directed by Magda Teresa Wójcik & Henryk Boukołowski, Hungarian Culture Centre, Warsaw, Poland
 1990:	Robots Tales (Bajki Robotów) by Stanisław Lem, directed by Magda Teresa Wójcik, Teatr Adekwatny, Warsaw, Poland
 1991:	A Dangerous Game (Die Panne) by Friedrich Dürrenmatt, directed by Tomasz Wójcik, Teatr Adekwatny, Warsaw, Poland
 1991:	Enjoy your youth (Ciesz się swoją młodością) on the basis of mercenaries relations, directed by Wojciech Feliksiak, Teatr Adekwatny, Warsaw, Poland
 1992:	The Little Prince by Antoine de Saint - Exupéry, directed by Magda Teresa Wójcik, Teatr im. Wilama Horzycy, Toruń, Poland
 1992:	Antigone by Sophocles, directed by Henryk Boukołowski & Magda Teresa Wójcik, Teatr Adekwatny, Warsaw, Poland
 1992:	The Little Prince by Antoine de Saint - Exupèry, directed by Magda Teresa Wójcik, Haarlems Toneel, Haarlem, The Netherlands
 1993:	Pinocchio by Carlo Collodi, directed by Magda Teresa Wójcik, Teatr Adekwatny, Warsaw, Poland
 1993:	The Little Prince by Antoine de Saint - Exupèry, directed by Magda Teresa Wójcik, Teatr Współczesny, Szczecin, Poland
 1993:	Sindbad the Sailor (Sindbad Żeglarz) by Bolesław Leśmian, directed by Joanna Cichoń, Teatr Adekwatny, Warsaw, Poland
 1993:	The Defence of Warsaw - Tale about Stefan Starzyński (Obrona Warszawy – rzecz o Stefanie Starzyńskim), directed by Henryk Boukołowski, Teatr Adekwatny, Warsaw, Poland
 1994:	The Trial by Franz Kafka, directed by Henryk Boukołowski, Teatr Adekwatny, Warsaw, Poland
 1994:	Germans (Niemcy) by Leon Kruczkowski, directed by Magda Teresa Wójcik, Teatr Adekwatny, Warsaw, Poland
 1994:	Kordian by Juliusz Słowacki, directed by Henryk Boukołowski, Teatr Adekwatny, Warsaw, Poland
 1996:	Cyd (Le Cid) by Pierre Corneille, directed by Tomasz Konieczny, Teatr Na Woli, Warsaw, Poland
 1996:	Legends of Warsaw Old Town (Legendy Warszawskiej Starówki) by Or - Ot, directed by Magda Teresa Wójcik & Henryk Boukołowski, Old Town (the open air), Warsaw, Poland
 1996:	Gelsomino by Gianni Rodari, directed by Henryk Boukołowski, Teatr Dramatyczny, Warsaw, Poland
 1997:	Mister Thaddeus (Pan Tadeusz) by Adam Mickiewicz, directed by Magda Teresa Wójcik, Teatr Kameralny, Warsaw, Poland
 1997:	Richard III by William Shakespeare, directed by Henryk Boukołowski, Teatr Kameralny, Warsaw, Poland
 1997:	The Greek Myths by Robert Graves, directed by Magda Teresa Wójcik & Tomasz Konieczny, Teatr Kameralny, Warsaw, Poland
 1998:	Mickiewicz’s fables (Bajki Mickiewicza) by Adam Mickiewicz, directed by Henryk Boukołowski, Teatr Dramatyczny, Warsaw, Poland
 1998:	Talking with an oppressor (Rozmowy z katem) by Kazimierz Moczarski, directed by Magda Teresa Wójcik, Teatr Kameralny, Warsaw, Poland
 1998:	National Nights (Noce Narodowe) by Roman Braendstetter, directed by Włodzimierz Szpak, Jarosław Iwaszkewicz Museum, Podkowa Leśna, Poland
 1999:	Kordian by Juliusz Słowacki, directed by Henryk Boukołowski, Teatr Kameralny, Warsaw, Poland
 1999:	The Miser (L'Avare ou L'École du mensonge ) by Moliere, directed by Magda Teresa Wójcik, Teatr Kameralny, Warsaw, Poland
 2000:	Plague (La Peste) by Albert Camus, directed by Magda Teresa Wójcik, Teatr Kameralny, Warsaw, Poland
 2001:	Fircyk in advances (Fircyk w zalotach) by Franciszek Zabłocki, directed by Joanna Cichoń, Teatr Kameralny, Warsaw, Poland
 2001:	Laments (Treny) by Jan Kochanowski, directed by Henryk Boukołowski, Teatr Dramatyczny, Warsaw, Poland
 2001:	Promethidion by Cyprian Kamil Norwid, directed by Henryk Boukołowski, ?
 2002:	The Emperor (Cesarz) by Ryszard Kapuściński, directed by Magda Teresa Wójcik, Teatr Dramatyczny, Warsaw, Poland
 2002:	Cinderella (Kopciuszek) by Jan Brzechwa, directed by Magda Teresa Wójcik, Łazienki Królewskie – Teatr na Wodzie, Warsaw, Poland
 2002:	The Dismissal of the Greek Envoys (Odprawa posłów greckich) by Jan Kochanowski, directed by Henryk Boukołowski, Teatr Dramatyczny, Warsaw, Poland
 2003:	Macbeth by William Shakespeare, directed by Tomasz Wójcik, Teatr Na Woli, Warsaw, Poland
 2003:	The Trial by Franz Kafka, directed by Henryk Boukołowski, Teatr Adekwatny, Warsaw, Poland
 2004:	Candlestick (Le chandelier) by Alfred de Musset, directed by Henryk Boukołowski, Jarosław Iwaszkewicz Museum, Podkowa Leśna, Poland
 2004:	Improvisations (Improwizacje)  by Adam Mickiewicz, directed by Henryk Boukołowski, Teatr Na Woli, Warsaw, Poland
 2005:	Faceting death (In articulo mortis) on the basis of works of Baczyński, Gajcy, Wierzyński, Trzebiński, directed by Magda Teresa Wójcik, Teatr na Woli, Warsaw, Poland
 2006:	Wait full of light (Świetliste oczekiwanie) by Jan Lechoń, directed by Magda Teresa Wójcik, Teatr Na Woli, Warsaw, Poland

Selected Scientific Publications 
 1997:	T. Wójcik, B. Rubinowicz, Influence of the cross-modulation effect on intensity of waves transmitted through a non-linear Fabry-Perot cavity, Opt. App. Vol. XXVII, No. 1
 1997:	T. Wójcik, B. Rubinowicz, Influence of the cross-modulation effect on the polarization states of waves transmitted through a non-linear Fabry-Perot cavity, Opt. Quant. Elect. 29 725-737
 1998:	B. Rubinowicz, T. Wójcik, Influence of the Kerr medium type on the wave’s reflection states at nonlinear interface for different angles of incidence, J. Opt. Soc. Am. A Vol.15 Iss.5 1436-1449
 1998:	T. Wójcik, B. Rubinowicz, Two-wave reflection at nonlinear interface, J. Opt. Soc. Am B Vol.15 Iss.7 1856-1864

Theatre posters

Film posters

Other posters

Photographs

References

External links 

 
 Tomasz Wójcik Portfolio: posters, CD-covers, film trailers
 Portfolio 2017
 Tomasz Wójcik animations
 Tomasz Wójcik – Encyclopedia of Polish Theater
 Tomasz Wójcik Macbeth 2003 – AICT (International Theatre Critics Association)
 Tomasz Wójcik 2014 poster exhibition in Budapest (Hungary)

Polish poster artists
21st-century Polish physicists
Polish engravers
Polish theatre directors
1963 births
Living people